Uma Jalsu (Aymara for spring, source) is a  mountain in the Andes of Bolivia. It is located in the La Paz Department, Eliodoro Camacho Province, Umanata Municipality. Uma Jalsu lies on the right bank of the Suches River, northwest of Umanata.

References 

Mountains of La Paz Department (Bolivia)